The Cosmopolitan of Las Vegas (commonly referred to simply as The Cosmopolitan or The Cosmo) is a resort casino and hotel on the Las Vegas Strip in Paradise, Nevada. The resort opened on December 15, 2010, and is located just south of the Bellagio on the west side of Las Vegas Boulevard. It is owned by The Blackstone Group, Stonepeak Partners, and Cherng Family Trust and operated by MGM Resorts International.

It consists of two highrise towers, the Boulevard Tower and the Chelsea Tower, both of which are 184 meters (603 ft) tall.

In 2013, the hotel was rated "The Best Hotel in the World" by Gogobot. In 2015, the resort was named to the Condé Nast Traveller Gold List as one of the "Top Hotels in the World".

Amenities
The Cosmopolitan's  casino features views of the Las Vegas Strip. The Pools at the Cosmopolitan features three different types: a relaxing pool, day club pool and nightclub pool.

The Cosmopolitan is also home to the Marquee Nightclub & Dayclub, which was the top grossing nightclub in the United States in 2012.

The Cosmopolitan also has a bar called the "Chandelier Bar," and it's famous for its lemony flower drink, made of Yuzu, the Japanese lemon. The Chandelier Bar of the Cosmopolitan is a very popular place for its looks. It was made of more than 2 million crystal beads.

History

Plans for the property were first announced in April 2004. The developer, 3700 Associates, was a joint venture formed by David Friedman (a former Las Vegas Sands executive), Ian Bruce Eichner (a real estate developer), and Soros Fund Management. The developers purchased the site, an 8.5-acre U-shaped parcel surrounding the Jockey Club timeshare building, for $90 million from a company controlled by New Frontier owner Margaret Elardi. Further details about the project, including the Cosmopolitan name, were released in November 2004.

The Cosmopolitan's design team was led by Friedmutter Group as executive architect, with Arquitectonica as the design architect for the building's themed exterior. The building was engineered by DeSimone Consulting Engineers. The interior design team included Digital Kitchen, Prophet, the Friedmutter Group, The Rockwell Group, Jeffrey Beers, Adam Tihany, and Bentel & Bentel.

The resort was built on what used to be the parking lot for the Jockey Club. Because the Cosmopolitan occupies much of the parking lot, it was agreed that the Club residents could use part of the Cosmopolitan's parking garage.

The Cosmopolitan was the second Las Vegas hotel, after The Palazzo, to feature an underground parking garage underneath the hotel. As a result, the parking garage was built first. In December 2007, work finished on the  hole for the parking structure, while other foundation work remained in progress. The hotel was originally planned to open and be operated by Hyatt as the Grand Hyatt Las Vegas.

Original plans called for the casino to be on the second floor, but this was later changed and the casino was built on ground level, like most other Las Vegas hotel-casinos. Planned condo units were cancelled and replaced with studios and other hotel rooms.

In January 2008, it was reported that the $3.9 billion project faced financial complications, as Eichner's company defaulted on a $760 million construction loan from Deutsche Bank when the developer missed a payment after failing to secure refinancing for the project. Construction moved forward as the developers searched for new financing. In late February 2008, Global Hyatt Corporation and New York-based Marathon Asset Management agreed to recapitalize the condominium-hotel project. However, one month later the developer said Deutsche Bank AG would begin foreclosure proceedings. They bought the hotel for $1 billion during the summer and hired The Related Cos., developers of Time Warner Center in New York, to re-position the asset, manage the development process and assist in leasing the retail and restaurant collection. Related recommended many revisions, including bringing the casino entrance onto the strip.

In June 2008, Hearst filed a trademark suit against the owners of the casino. Hearst owns the trademark to Cosmopolitan magazine. In March 2010, the suit was settled, and the resort was renamed Cosmopolitan of Las Vegas.

In August 2008, it was announced that MGM Mirage, Starwood, Hyatt and Hilton Worldwide were in talks to acquire the property. It was speculated that MGM Mirage would integrate the project into Bellagio and CityCenter; Starwood were to establish its W Hotels and St. Regis Hotels brands; and Hyatt would have continued with its plans to operate a Grand Hyatt. In April 2009, the Sun reported that the hotel would be managed by Hilton and would become the Hilton's first in their new Denizen hotel line. Later that month, however, those plans changed; Starwood sued Hilton, claiming trade-secret theft and essentially killing the Denizen brand.

In June 2009, 400 homebuyers filed a lawsuit against the developers, claiming breach of contract and seeking refunds for their deposits. They believed that the projected finish date of June 2010 was unrealistic and expressed fear that the developers might turn the condo rooms into hotel rooms only or "finish the building as a shell and not do any interior work."

In April 2010, it was announced that the Cosmopolitan would open in stages, beginning in December and ending in July 2011. It was the only hotel-casino to open on the Strip in 2010. The project officially opened on December 15, 2010, and became part of Marriott International's Autograph Collection, a collection of independent hotels with access to Marriott's reservation and rewards system. In January 2014, the Cosmopolitan announced that points through their Identity rewards program could be redeemed at 3,800 of Marriott's properties.

In May 2014, the Cosmopolitan was sold by Deutsche Bank to Blackstone Group for $1.73 billion.

On July 25, 2015, a fire broke out on the pool deck of the resort, burning trees and cabanas, and sending plumes of smoke into the air. Two people were treated for smoke inhalation as a result of the blaze, including one person who was transported to a local hospital. Investigators could not conclusively determine a cause for the fire, but suspected that guests had dropped burning cigarette butts from balconies onto outdoor furniture below.

In September 2021, the casino was sold to MGM Resorts International. MGM plans to operate the resort while a joint venture between Blackstone, Stonepeak Partners, and Cherng Family Trust will purchase the real estate assets. The acquisition was completed on May 17, 2022.

Restaurants
In March 2010, the casino announced several celebrity chefs and restaurants that would open there. Included were Bruce and Eric Bromberg's Blue Ribbon, Costas Spiliadis' Estiatorio Milos (which has since relocated to the Venetian), Scott Conant's Scarpetta, and David Myers' Comme Ça, which has been shuttered and replaced with other dining options.

On May 2, the resort announced that José Andrés would be joining the resort with three restaurants, creating his namesake restaurant, "é by José Andrés", and one based on his tapas restaurant, Jaleo. Another restaurant, China Poblano, is a new concept combining Mexican and Chinese cuisine.

The Cosmopolitan also gained the restaurant Eggslut in 2011, following success in their Grand Central Market location in Los Angeles. Starbucks also opened a location in the hotel in 2015 with direct access to the strip.

In 2018 several new restaurants were added at the hotel at Block 16 Urban Food Hall, a collection of grab-and-go or counter-style specialty restaurants. Headliners included Nashville-based Hattie B's Hot Chicken and Portland chef Andy Ricker's Thai restaurant, Pok Pok Wing. Pok Pok Wing closed in December 2020 due to the end of its licensing agreement.

Chef and owner Christina Tosi added a Milk Bar serving desserts and stacks and following the same format as her stores in New York City, Toronto and Washington, D.C.

In 2021, Superfrico, described as "psychedelic Italian" dining, opened in the space previously occupied by Rose, Rabbit, Lie.

Closed restaurants
A modern supper club called Rose, Rabbit, Lie opened in December 2013. Operated by Spiegelworld as part of its Vegas Nocturne show through July 2014 and by the Cosmopolitan itself thereafter, the club offered dining and drinks with live entertainment before closing in January 2021.

Resident productions
Currently, the Cosmpolitan hosts OPM, a performance by the production troop Spiegelworld. Set on a spaceship called OPM 73 with a destination of Uranus, the adults-only dinner show features circus-themed routines, loosely tied together with a comedic storyline.

Controversies
In April 2011, Cosmopolitan security staff allegedly removed a transgender guest named Stephanie from a women's restroom, photographed her, and said that she would be banned for life if she did not leave the premises. Shortly after the incident, the hotel-casino was flooded with complaints on its Facebook page, which prompted the hotel-casino to issue an apology to the transgender community and to Stephanie that they would "welcome her back to the resort anytime." The incident also prompted the hotel-casino to train its staff on awareness initiatives involving the sensitive issue.

In May 2019, the tabloid news website TMZ reported an incident between Meek Mill and the hotel claiming he was racially discriminated against while trying to enter the hotel's nightclub. Mr. Mill's lawyer sent a demand letter stating in part, "... we have learned that the Cosmopolitan maintains a list of African American recording artists who should be denied access for no other reason than their culture and skin color. Such course of conduct constitutes discrimination per se, in violation of state and federal law, and exposes you to significant monetary damages."  The letter goes on -- "...we urge you to promptly issue an apology to Mr. Williams and grant him immediate access.  In the event you fail to heed this one and only warning, we intend to pursue all legal recourse against you."  The hotel later apologized stating "we (the hotel) did not act in a respectful manner and were wrong" and confirmed a zero tolerance for discrimination.

In popular culture
 The Cosmopolitan was the setting for The Killers music video for "Shot at the Night".
 The Cosmopolitan was the setting for Top Chef Masters Season 4.

Gallery

See also

 Autograph Collection Hotels
 List of tallest buildings in Las Vegas

References

Sources
 'Cosmo says hello: Guests see model of condo-hotel', Howard Stutz, Las Vegas Review-Journal, October 26, 2005.

External links

 

2010 establishments in Nevada
Autograph Collection Hotels
Casinos completed in 2010
Condo hotels in the United States
Hotel buildings completed in 2010
Casinos in the Las Vegas Valley
Hotels established in 2010
Las Vegas Strip
Mixed martial arts venues in Nevada
Residential skyscrapers in the Las Vegas Valley
Resorts in the Las Vegas Valley
Skyscraper hotels in Paradise, Nevada
2022 mergers and acquisitions
Arquitectonica buildings